Red Sonja is an upcoming American sword and sorcery film based on the Dynamite Entertainment comic books of the same name. Matilda Lutz will star as the title character.

Cast 
 Matilda Lutz as Red Sonja
 Wallis Day as Annisia
 Robert Sheehan as Draygan
 Michael Bisping as Hawk
 Martyn Ford as General Karlak
 Eliza Matengu as Amarak
 Rhona Mitra
 Veronica Ferres as Ashera and the mother of Red Sonja

Production 
A second Red Sonja film has been in development for some years. In 2008, Robert Rodriguez and his production company Troublemaker Studios were working on a version that would have starred Rose McGowan as the titular character. By 2009 however, the Rodriguez project had been scrapped, and as of February 2010, rights holders Nu Image are moving forward with another projected new film, to be directed by Simon West. Producer Avi Lerner has said he would like to see Amber Heard take the role of Sonja, after having worked with her on Drive Angry. Lerner says the film will shoot before the sequel to Conan the Barbarian. In August 2012, at the premiere of The Expendables 2, West said that the film is still a go and will be out soon. On February 26, 2015, Christopher Cosmos was set to write the screenplay from a scrap. According to Deadline, Millennium Films would finance and produce a new Red Sonja movie with Avi Lerner and Joe Gatta producing alongside Cinelou Films' Mark Canton and Courtney Solomon and writing by Ashley Miller. In October 2018, Bryan Singer was confirmed to direct the film. On February 11, 2019, Millennium Films announced Red Sonja was no longer on their slate of films, due to recent sexual assault allegations against Singer. In March 2019, Lerner dropped Singer from the project because he was unable to secure a domestic distributor. In June 2019, Joey Soloway signed on to write, direct and produce the film.

In February 2021, Tasha Huo was hired to write the script with Soloway, and casting was set to begin. By May, Hannah John-Kamen was cast in the titular role. In March 2022, John-Kamen and Soloway left, with M. J. Bassett replacing Soloway as director. That August, Millennium confirmed that the film had begun production in Sofia, Bulgaria, with Matilda Lutz playing the title role. In September 2022, Oliver Trevena was set to appear as Tr'aal. In October 2022, Rhona Mitra was cast in an undisclosed role, while Trevena exited the film due to scheduling conflicts. In November 2022, Veronica Ferres was cast as Ashera and the mother of Red Sonja. On 12 November 2022, it was reported that filming had been underway for two weeks at studios in the Thermi suburb of Thessaloniki, Greece, with post-production to be completed there as well.

The film is based on the Dynamite Entertainment version of the character. These comics introduced a concept where the original Marvel Comics Sonja was killed and replaced by Dynamite's "reincarnation". Luke Lieberman will serve as a producer under Red Sonja LLC, while Nick Barrucci will serve as an executive producer for Dynamite Entertainment.

References

External links 
 

2020s fantasy action films
2020s fantasy adventure films
American sword and sorcery films
Dynamite Entertainment adaptations
Films shot in Bulgaria
Films shot in Greece
Reboot films
Red Sonja
Upcoming English-language films